Training Day is the second album by North Carolina hip hop duo The Away Team, was released in 2007 on the Hall of Justus label, featuring contributions from unofficial third member Nervous Reck, Evidence (of Dilated Peoples), Sean Price, Black Milk, Supastition and Darien Brockington.

Track listing
Scream Out!!
Look at Me (featuring Nervous Reck)
Sum of Me (featuring Evidence & Darien Brockington)
Awesome (featuring Billionz)
The Odds
Steppin' on Toes
Chitter Chatter (featuring Black Milk)
Rockabye (featuring Supastition & Nervous Reck)
Greedy
Don't Wait
Psycho Ward (featuring Sean Price)
I'm a Fool

References

2007 albums
Albums produced by Khrysis
The Away Team (group) albums